Citricoccus muralis is a Gram-positive and aerobic bacterium from the genus Citricoccus which has been isolated from a wall painting from Sankt Georgen ob Judenburg, Austria.

References

Bacteria described in 2002
Micrococcaceae